Sex Style: The Un-Released Archives is a compilation album by rapper, Kool Keith.  The album was released on November 6, 2007 and contained unreleased material originally recorded in 1994 and 1995. Keith's alias "The Phantom," first heard on "Sly We Fly" from the released Sex Style is used on much of the album.

Track listing
"Prepare"- 3:50
"You Know the Game"- 3:57
"Rubba Love"- 4:42
"From tha Back"- 4:18
"Big Eyes"- 3:58
"Droppin' Seeds"- 3:32
"Why You Frontin'?"- 3:39
"Remember Me?"- 4:26
"Freak It"- 4:07
"Time for Business"- 4:20
"You Get Yours"- 4:02
"Spread 'Em"- 2:50
"Time for Sex"- 4:38
"Anal Conquests"- 1:09
"Erotic Ride"- 4:21
"Wet You Up"- 4:42
"Big Eyes" (Demo Version)- 10:16

Kool Keith albums
Hip hop compilation albums
2007 compilation albums